The Mercer's Mill Covered Bridge or Mercer's Ford Covered Bridge is a covered bridge that spans the East branch of the Octoraro Creek on the border between Lancaster County and Chester County in Pennsylvania, United States. A Lancaster County-owned and maintained bridge, its official designation is the East Octoraro #2 Bridge.

The bridge has a single span, wooden, double Burr arch trusses design with the addition of steel hanger rods.  The deck is made from oak planks.  It is painted red, the traditional color of Lancaster County covered bridges, on both the inside and outside.  Both approaches to the bridge are painted in the traditional white color.  The bridge has a single window on only one side of the bridge.

The bridge's WGCB Numbers are 38-15-19/38-36-38.  Added in 1980, it is listed on the National Register of Historic Places as structure number 80003509.  It is located at  (39.93150, -75.98150). The bridge is located in Sadsbury Township, 0.5 miles (0.8 km) south of Christiana on Bailey Crossroads Road off Creek Road, to the south of Pennsylvania Route 372.

History 
The bridge was built in 1880 by B. J. Carter. Along with the Pine Grove Covered Bridge (built in 1884), it was one of a number of covered bridges built along the border between Lancaster and Chester counties.

Dimensions 
Length: 80 feet (26.5 m) span Note:
Width: 15 feet 4 inches (4.7 m) Note:
Overhead clearance: 11 feet 6 inches (3.5 m)
Underclearance:  13 feet 6 inches (4.1 m)

Gallery

See also
Burr arch truss
List of Lancaster County covered bridges

References 

Covered bridges in Chester County, Pennsylvania
Covered bridges in Lancaster County, Pennsylvania
Bridges completed in 1880
Covered bridges on the National Register of Historic Places in Pennsylvania
National Register of Historic Places in Chester County, Pennsylvania
National Register of Historic Places in Lancaster County, Pennsylvania
Road bridges on the National Register of Historic Places in Pennsylvania
Wooden bridges in Pennsylvania
Burr Truss bridges in the United States